The Waterways Trust was an independent registered charity, established in 1999, that worked with partners to see the waterway network in England, Wales and Scotland supported, valued and enjoyed by a wide audience. The Trust was formerly registered in England and Wales and in Scotland, until July 2012 when the operations in England and Wales were merged with the newly established Canal & River Trust. The remaining operations in Scotland were renamed the Scottish Waterways Trust.

The Trust's principal funder was British Waterways. Its Patron was The Prince of Wales, and its Vice Presidents were Paul Atterbury, John Craven OBE, John Fletcher, Miranda Krestovnikoff, Sonia Rolt, David Suchet OBE and Timothy West CBE.

The Trust also cared for the nationally important inland waterways collection and the National Waterways Museum at Ellesmere Port, the Waterways Museum Gloucester and the Canal Museum at Stoke Bruerne.

The Trust also operated a Small Grants Scheme, and administered the annual Waterways Renaissance Awards jointly with the British Urban Regeneration Association (BURA).

See also
List of waterway societies in the United Kingdom

References

External links

Transport charities based in the United Kingdom
Waterways organisations in the United Kingdom
2012 disestablishments in the United Kingdom